Horrid Henry: The Movie is a 2011 British 3D children's film directed by Nick Moore and produced by Allan Niblo, Rupert Preston, Mike Watts and Lucinda Whiteley, who wrote it. In the film, Henry and the Purple Hand Gang fight to prevent the closure of their school by an evil private school headmaster. It is based on the fictional character Horrid Henry from the children's book series of the same name by Francesca Simon. The film itself takes place before Series 3 of the TV Series.

Horrid Henry: The Movie stars Theo Stevenson, Richard E. Grant, Parminder Nagra, Kimberley Walsh, Mathew Horne, Siobhan Hayes, Dick and Dom, Noel Fielding, Jo Brand and Anjelica Huston. It was the first British film for children to be shot in 3D, and was officially released in cinemas on 29 July 2011 in 2D, RealD 3D, and 3D formats by Vertigo Films in the United Kingdom.

Phase 4 Films and Entertainment One released the film in theatres in the United States and Canada on 22 December 2012. The film received generally negative reviews from critics, with criticism for the plot, script, humor, visual effects, and lack of imagination, however, the colour palette, acting, and loyalty to the source material received praise. Horrid Henry: The Movie grossed $10.1 million worldwide. Horrid Henry: The Movie was released on DVD and Blu-ray on 28 November 2011 in the United Kingdom. Horrid Henry: The Movie has sold over 750,000 DVD copies in the UK.

Plot
A young boy named Henry is frequently described as horrid by his friends, family and teachers. Henry manages to steal biscuits from his neighbour and arch-enemy, Moody Margaret; and her friends Sour Susan and Singing Soraya. However, as Henry gets back to his garden, his Mum catches him and angrily orders him to do his homework.

After failing to complete his homework yet again, his homework book: gets milk spilled on it, the pet cat Fluffy walks over it, gets sat on, and lost under the sofa. After the book is ripped up, (and having no way of copying someone else’s homework) Henry has his friend Brainy Brian forge a note from his mother claiming that his cat ate it. His teacher, Miss Battle-Axe, sees through Henry's scheme as the word "homework" is spelled correctly, something Henry is incapable of doing. While Henry is in detention, his friends join him to rehearse for a school talent contest; they are interrupted by Mrs Oddbod, the Headmistress, and a pair of school inspectors.

Meanwhile, Vic Van Wrinkle, Headmaster of the expensive all-boys private academy, Brick House School, influences the school inspectors to close down Ashton Primary, the school Henry attends, hoping to make a fortune from the resulting influx of students. In order to get back at Henry for stealing her biscuits, Margaret decides to initiate a revenge scheme. Margaret and Susan tie a bucket of purple slime to the classroom door, knowing Henry will be the last into class. Unfortunately for her, Miss Battle-Axe walks in before Henry and gets slimed instead. Miss Battle-Axe blames Henry for this. Mrs Oddbod is forced to fire Miss Battle-Axe for failing to discipline her class. In retaliation, a devastated Miss Battle-Axe allows her class to go home early. 

The inspectors encourage Henry’s pranks and put special orange slime in his bag. Henry and Margaret accidentally slime Miss Lovely, Peter’s teacher. Miss Lovely walks out of the lesson rather than telling off Henry and Margaret, which forces Mrs Oddbod to fire Miss Lovely for failing to enforce discipline. Mrs Oddbod also bans Henry’s band, the Zero Zombies, from entering the talent contest.

Due to having to fire two teachers, Ashton Primary is on the brink of closing, Henry's Great Aunt Greta offers to pay for Henry to attend an all-girls private academy (thinking Henry is a girl) and his younger brother, Perfect Peter, to attend Brick House. Miss Lovely applies for a job at Brick House and spies on Van Wrinkle; she is captured, but passes notes about Van Wrinkle's plan to Peter. Meanwhile, Henry and Margaret (who has also been transferred to the school) are attacked because the students are unhappy with a boy in their school and they escape from the girls' school. 

Henry and the Zero Zombies compete in the talent contest, hoping that their win will make them famous enough that Ashton Primary will not close. The band wins the contest, but Mrs Oddbod informs Henry that fame is irrelevant in this case. 

Henry is later invited onto a game show (one of Henry’s favourite TV shows) known as 2 Cool 4 School and Margaret suggests that they use the cash prize to bribe the school inspectors to leave Ashton Primary alone. In the final round of the game, Henry is confronted by Miss Battle-Axe, who challenges him to spell "homework." Recalling Miss Battle-Axe's earlier admonitions and using "Oh, Henry" as a mnemonic device, he finally spells the word correctly and wins. 

Meanwhile, Peter and his friends try to rescue Miss Lovely, but are captured by Van Wrinkle. Miss Lovely tricks Van Wrinkle into explaining his plan while Peter has her mobile phone on a call with Mrs Oddbod, who calls the police. Van Wrinkle attempts to escape, but falls over due to Peter tying his shoelaces together; he and the school inspectors are arrested. Henry offers the cash prize to Mrs Oddbod, who declines it and explains that the school has already been saved; the money is instead used for a large party at Henry's house.

Cast
 Theo Stevenson as Horrid Henry, who is considered horrid due to his behaviour.
 Richard E. Grant as Vic Van Wrinkle, the Headmaster of Brick House.
 Parminder Nagra as Miss Lovely, Perfect Peter's teacher who is kind and optimistic.
 Mathew Horne as Silly Simon (Dad), the father of Henry and Peter and the husband of Mum.
 Noel Fielding as Ed Banger, the lead singer of the Killer Boy Rats, Henry's favourite band.
 Prunella Scales as Great Aunt Greta, Henry's great aunt who thinks that Henry is a girl named Henrietta and that Peter is a teenager.
 David Schneider as Soggy Sid, the P.E teacher at Ashton Primary who despises Henry. 
 Siobhan Hayes as Ecstatic EIlieen (Mum), the mother of Henry and Peter and the wife of Dad.
 Helen Lederer as Rich Aunt Ruby, the sister of Mum and the wealthy aunt of Henry and Peter.
 Rebecca Front as Mrs Oddbod, the Headmistress of Ashton Primary who often confiscates toys and sweets from her students.
 Kimberley Walsh as Prissy Polly, Henry and Peter's older cousin.
 Anjelica Huston as Miss Battle-Axe, the teacher of Henry and his class who despises him, yet is determined to teach him something.
 Scarlett Stitt as Moody Margaret, the Arch enemy of Henry who lives next door to him and the Leader of the Secret Club.
 Ross Marron as Perfect Peter, the younger brother of Henry who is good and well-behaved.
 Lloyd Howells as Rude Ralph, Henry's best friend.
 Jack Sanders as Aerobic Al, an athletic boy who is good friends with Henry.
 Connor O'Mara as Beefy Bert, a boy who lacks intelligence and always says "I dunno" who is a friend of Henry's.
 Reuben Lee as Brainy Brian, the most intelligent in his class and a friend of Henry's.
 Jo Brand as Greasy Greta, a dinner lady who serves Henry stew on 2 Cool 4 School.
 Billy Kennedy as Weepy William, a sensitive boy who often gets emotional and a friend of Henry's.
 Helena Barlow as Sour Susan, Moody Margaret's best friend who usually copies what she says.
 Nikita Mistry as Gorgeous Gurinder, a vain girl who is friends with Margaret.
 Ela Warburton as Lazy Linda, a lazy girl who often sleeps in class and a friend of Margaret's.
 Nethra Tilakumara as Singing Soraya, a girl who enjoys singing and often sings her sentences and a friend of Margaret's.
 Metin and Timur Ahmet as the School Inspectors, the Henchmen of Vic Van Wrinkle who are being paid to help get Ashton Primary closed down.
 Dick and Dom as the presenters of 2 Cool 4 School.
 Frank Kauer as Spotless Sam, a tidy boy who is best friends with Peter.
 Joshua-James Thomas as Goody Goody Gordon, a well-behaved boy who is best friends with Peter.
 Gabriel Werb as Tidy Ted, a tidy boy who is best friends with Peter.
 Tyger Drew-Honey as Stuck-up Steve, the snobby older cousin of Henry and Peter, who is spoiled and attends Brick House.
 Tamsin Heatley as Miss Impatience Tutu, the dance teacher at Ashton Primary who teaches some students ballet.
 Philip Pope as Moody Margaret's Dad, the lenient father of Margaret who spoils her.
 Kia Pegg as Vicious Vicky, the younger sister of Sour Susan who frequently bites people for no reason.
 Grant Logan as Wheely Walter, the Science teacher at Ashton Primary who is in a wheelchair.
 Lily and Sasha Demetriou Ottaway as Vomiting Vera, the baby girl of Prissy Polly.
 Elizabeth Waterworth-Santo as Nitty Nora, a Nit Nurse.
 Waterworth-Santo also reprises her voice of Henry from the TV series during the song "When I'm King".

Soundtrack

The soundtrack was released on 1 January 2011, New Year's Day, by Universal Music TV.

Release
Horrid Henry: The Movie was theatrically released on 29 July 2011, in the U.K. by Vertigo Films. It was later released on DVD and Blu-ray on 28 November, that same year, in the United Kingdom.

Reception
The film opened at #5 in the box office in the United Kingdom with £1.3 million, in a Top 10 led by Harry Potter and the Deathly Hallows – Part 2 and Captain America: The First Avenger. It was knocked down the next week to #7, by Super 8 and Mr. Popper's Penguins.

The film received generally negative reviews from critics. Review aggregator website Rotten Tomatoes reports that 9% of 22 reviews for Horrid Henry: The Movie are positive; the average rating is 3.60/10. Common criticisms included the unfunny, juvenile humour, stuttering plot, and unimaginative use of stereoscopy. The bright colour palette was widely praised, but generally said to be wasted, given the overall low quality of the film.

Leslie Felperin of Variety stated: 'Thinly scripted, even for a kidpic, but luridly colored enough to keep even nap needing tots (or parents) awake, this sophomore effort by Brit helmer Nick Moore (Wild Child) reps something of a waste of its impressive roster of supporting thespian talent, while its use of 3D is likewise less than imaginative.'

Derek Adams offered the film mild praise in Time Out: "Horrid Henry is indelibly flawed and disorderly in tone but not devoid of rambunctious charm". When interviewed on Desert Island Discs by Kirsty Young, Horrid Henry book author Francesca Simon stated: 'I haven't seen it (the film)...I had nothing to do with it.'

Sequel
In an interview with Novel Entertainment, aired out in January 2020 after the success of Horrid Henry: The Movie being aired on Nicktoons, executive producer Lucinda Whiteley said she was 'absolutely [working on a sequel]! And not just one but two sequels, as the story of how Henry ends up saving the world needs more than just 90 minutes!'
But instead of working with Vertigo Films, Novel Entertainment decided to work with StudioCanal on the sequels. The sequels would be animated and will have the original cast from the TV series.

See also
 Horrid Henry
 Horrid Henry (TV series)

References

External links
 

 

2011 films
2011 3D films
2011 independent films
2010s musical comedy films
2010s adventure comedy films
British 3D films
British adventure comedy films
British adventure films
British comedy films
British independent films
British musical comedy films
Films about shapeshifting
Films based on children's books
Films set in schools
2010s screwball comedy films
British slapstick comedy films
Vertigo Films films
2010s children's adventure films
2011 comedy films
Films directed by Nick Moore
2010s English-language films
2010s British films